Harry Britten (3 September 1870 – 31 January 1954) was a British entomologist who worked at the Manchester Museum. He was involved in collecting and growing the collection of the Manchester Museum in numerous groups. A namesake son (1894-1976) also took an interest in entomology and specialized in flies of the family Tephritidae.

Britten was born in Whiteparish, Wiltshire, and grew up in Scotland and later Penrith, Cumbria, where his father Henry became a gamekeeper at Skirtwith Abbey owned by E.W. Parker. He later worked in the railways and then as a keeper at an estate. He became interested in insects while in Cumberland. He worked with E. B. Poulton, J. Collins and A.H. Hamm in 1913 and in 1919 he joined the Manchester Museum as an assistant to T.A. Coward, later becoming curator and working there until 1937. He was a keen collector but also worked meticulously, described the Ptiliidae collected by the Percy Sladen Expedition to Seychelles, revised the genus Ptenidium, and co-wrote a book on the pests of stored products with Hayhurst. He introduced various techniques, such as the use of bird pin-feathers mounted on wooden handle to set delicate specimens and the storage of acari slides in envelopes along with a note describing provenance and other information. Britten received an honorary MSc in 1952 from Manchester University. He was a member of the Manchester Microscopical Society, the Manchester Entomological Society, the Royal Entomological Society and a special life fellow of the Linnean Society, among others.

References 

1870 births
1954 deaths
English entomologists
Fellows of the Linnean Society of London